Saint Vincent and the Grenadines and the United Kingdom have a long history, tracing back to early British settlements and British conflicts with the French during the Colonial era.

History 

Control of the island of Saint Vincent was ceded to Britain by the French following the signing of the Treaty of Paris in 1763. The French recaptured the island but ceded it again after the second Treaty of Paris in 1783.

The British began a program of agricultural development and established plantations across the island; a program opposed by local Black Caribs. 

Saint Vincent remained under French colonial rule for the until independence movements began in the 20th century.

Saint Vincent was granted "associate statehood" status by Britain on 27 October 1969. This gave Saint Vincent complete control over its internal affairs but was short of full independence. On 27 October 1979, following a referendum under Milton Cato, Saint Vincent and the Grenadines became the last of the Windward Islands to gain independence. Independence came on the 10th anniversary of Saint Vincent's associate statehood status.

Current relations 

Saint Vincent and the Grenadines maintains a High Commission in South Kensington in London and a consulate-general in Comber, Northern Ireland. In turn, the United Kingdom maintains a High Commission in Kingstown.

References

External links 
High Commission for Saint Vincent and the Grenadines, UK
British High Commission, Bridgetown

 
United Kingdom
Saint Vincent and the Grenadines
Relations of colonizer and former colony